Minoa, was a town of ancient Greece on the island of Siphnos mentioned by Stephanus of Byzantium.

Its site is unlocated.

References

Populated places in the ancient Aegean islands
Former populated places in Greece
Sifnos
Lost ancient cities and towns